CeVIO is the collective name of a range of computer software projects, including Vision (digital signage) and Creative Studio (audio creation software). CeVIO was made to assist in the creation of user-generated content.  It works via text-to-speech method.

Overview
It allows audio creation software for speech and voice synthesizing. Speech and Song are this program's main features. The Speech portion offers a large dictionary of words to which Sato Sasara, Suzuki Tsudumi, and Takahashi speak from and are accurate in the Japanese language, although the option to manually edit it exists as well. The Speech portion was created with help of the HTS method. This method is famous in the VOCALOID fanbase because this method created the online synthesizers Sinsy, Open J-Talk, Renoid Player, and many more. The Speech portion offers different types of voices for each character.

CeVIO Creative Studio's speech intonation can be controlled with three parameters: cheery, angry, and sad. Other things can be controlled as well, such as volume and speed of consonants and vowels.

The software was initially released as "CeVIO Creative Studio FREE" with Sato Sasara as the only voice. One was free to create tracks, insert lyrics, and add breaths to the end of notes, but even then those would get caught up in the end of her already automatically set breaths. Anything else would require external software but didn't really stop the choppiness of her vowel transitions. After the release of "CeVIO Creative Studio S" on the 14th of November 2014, the FREE version was replaced by one-month free trial of the full version. The free demo version was no longer available since November 19, 2014.

In the full version, more options for fine-tuning became available. Fine-Tune Amplitude Timing, which allows editing of the choppiness. In addition to pitch, pitch-bends can now also be adjusted, along with vibrato, vibrato timing, volume and dynamics. Gender factor is also available, which makes the voice less or more mature. The option to import MIDI's and .xml's is still present. The file extension also has changed from the free version's ".ccs" to ".csv".

Products

CeVIO
Sato Sasara (さとうささら), a female vocal capable of singing and speech. 
Suzuki Tsudumi (すずきつづみ), a female vocal capable only of speech.
Takahashi (タカハシ), a male vocal capable only of speech.

1st PLACE
ONE (オネ) is a female vocal capable of speech and singing. She is the second vocal in the "- ARIA ON THE PLANETES -" project, the first being the Vocaloid IA. She was released on January 27, 2015, with a speaking voicebank only. A singing voicebank was later released on May 22, 2015.
IA (イア) is a female vocal, originally released for VOCALOID3 in the "- ARIA ON THE PLANETES -" project. A talking CeVIO vocal was received in March 2017, named "IA TALK -ARIA ON THE PLANETES". On June 29, 2018, IA English C was released, with a Power and Natural bank.  It was also confirmed that a talking English IA for CeVIO was in development.

XING Inc.
Akasaki Minato (赤咲湊) is the first member of the "Color Voice Series", a series of singing-only voicebanks by XING Inc. He is illustrated as a 25-year-old male representing the color red. He was released alongside Midorizaki Kasumi on February 19, 2015. The vocal is a counterpart to Kizaki Airi.
Midorizaki Kasumi (緑咲香澄) is the second member of the series. She is illustrated as a 27-year-old female representing the color green. She was released alongside Akasaki Minato on February 19, 2015. The vocal is a counterpart to Shirosaki Yuudai.
Ginsaki Yamato (銀咲大和) is the third member of the series. He is illustrated as a 50-year-old male representing the color silver. He was released alongside Kinzaki Koharu on March 19, 2015. The vocal is a counterpart to Kinzaki Koharu.
Kinzaki Koharu (金咲小春) is the fourth member of the series. She is illustrated as a 52-year-old female representing the color gold. She was released alongside Ginsaki Yamato on March 19, 2015. The vocal is a counterpart to Ginsaki Yamato.
Shirosaki Yuudai (白咲優大) is the fifth member of the series. He is illustrated as a 20-year-old male representing the color white. He was released alongside Kizaki Airi on April 23, 2015. The vocal is a counterpart to Midorizaki Kasumi.
Kizaki Airi (黄咲愛里) is the sixth member of the series. She is illustrated as an 18-year-old female representing the color yellow. She was released alongside Shirosaki Yuudai on April 23, 2015. The vocal is a counterpart to Akasaki Minato.
HAL-O-ROID (ハルオロイド・ミナミ) is a free vocal for the software with the voice of deceased Enka singer Haruo Minami.

KAMITSUBAKI STUDIO
KAFU (可不) is the first member in a series of singing voicebanks by Kamitsubaki Studio. She is a female AI voicebank described as a "musical isotope" of singer and VTuber KAF. KAFU was released on July 7th, 2021.
SEKAI (星界) is the second member of the series. She is a female AI voicebank described as a "musical isotope" of virtual singer Isekaijoucho. SEKAI was released on April 29, 2022.
RIME (裏命) is the third member of the series. She is a female AI voicebank described as a "musical isotope" of virtual singer RIM. RIME was released on October 25th, 2022.
COKO (狐子) is the fourth member of the series. She is a female AI voicebank described as a "musical isotope" of virtual singer KOKO. COKO was released on January 25th, 2023.
HARU (羽累) will be the fifth member of the series. She is a female AI voicebank described as a "musical isotope" of virtual rapper/singer Harusaruhi. HARU is scheduled to be released August 12nd, 2023.

Kizuna AI 
 #kzn is an AI vocal based on VTuber Kizuna AI. It was announced on February 25, 2022. It had 24-hour limited pre-sales on several dates, but the official release date is unannounced.

Bushiroad 

 POPY is one of the two voicebanks created as part of a collaboration between the BanG Dream! franchise and CeVIO. POPY is based on the character Kasumi Toyama, vocalist of BanG Dream! band Poppin'Party. POPY is an AI vocal, with data recorded from previous Poppin'Party songs. Her voice is provided by Kasumi's voice actress Aimi. POPY was released on December 21st, 2022.
 ROSE is the second vocal created for the BanG Dream! x CeVIO project. She is based on the character Yukina Minato, vocalist of Roselia, with AI data recorded from previous Roselia songs. Her voice is provided by Yukina's voice actress Aina Aiba. ROSE was released on December 21st, 2022.

SSS 
Tohoku Kiritan（東北きりたん）
Tohoku Itako（東北イタコ）
Tohoku Zunko（東北ずん子）

VOCALOMAKETS 
Yuzuki Yukari（結月ゆかり）

TOKYO6 ENTERTAINMENT 
Koharu Rikka（小春六花）
Natsuki Karin（夏色花梨）
Hanakuma Chihuyu（花隈千冬）

INCS toenter 
Ci flower

AH-Software 
Tsurumaki Maki（弦巻マキ）

ZAN-SHIN 
ROSA

U-Stella 
CCD-0500(FEE-chan)

Gasoline Alley 
Futaba Minato（双葉湊音） is the youth girl's singing voicebanks by Gasoline Alley. Her voice is provided by Sachika Misawa. She is released on December 2nd, 2022.

candy cream algorithm 
Kanato Meru（奏兎める）

Techno Speech 
Chis-A（知声）
Kirune（機流⾳）
Aisuu

Reception
In 2013 it won the Microsoft Innovation Award 2013 award. It also won an award in the CEDEC Awards 2013 event, after receiving 300,000 downloads.

References

External links

2013 software
Speech synthesis software
Singing software synthesizers